Alexander Ernst Fesca (22 May 1820 in Karlsruhe, 22 February 1849 in Braunschweig) was a German composer and pianist.

Life 
Alexander Ernst Fesca was born in Karlsruhe on 22 May 1820, as the second of four sons of composer Friedrich Ernst Fesca (1789–1826) and his wife Charlotte (born Dingelstedt, daughter of the horn player Johann Heinrich Dingelstedt).

Fesca received his first lessons from his father and made his debut at the age of 11 as a pianist in his hometown. At the age of 14 he graduated in composition at the Prussian Academy of Arts in Berlin. His teachers included August Wilhelm Bach (1796–1869), Wilhelm Taubert (1811–1891) and Carl Friedrich Rungenhagen (1778–1851).

In 1838, he returned to Karlsruhe. He got his first success with the operetta "Mariette" in the same year. Fesca was known during his short life mostly through his songs and piano pieces in which his talent is coupled with a certain musical lightness. This is probably also the reason why some music scholars deny "deeper level" and "artistic seriousness" of his works.

In 1841, his opera "The French in Spain" was staged with great success. In the same year, Prince Egon von Furstenberg appointed Fesca as Chamber Virtuoso. From 1842, he settled in Brunswick. In the local court theater on 25 July 1847 was premiered Fescas major work, five-act heroic-romantic opera "Il Trovatore" with a libretto by Frederick Schmetzer.

On 22 February 1849, Alexander Ernst Fesca, aged 28, died of lung disease in Braunschweig.

Works (partial list)
Adagio
 Espérance (op. 24)

Fantasias
 Fantasie auf Motive der Oper „Don Giovanni“ von Wolfgang Amadeus Mozart (op. 43)
 Fantasie auf Motive der Oper „Der Freischütz“ von Carl Maria von Weber (op. 50)
 Le dernier soupir (op. 58)

Piano Sextets
 Klaviersextett B-Dur (op. 8)

Piano Trios
 Klaviertrio Nr. 1 (op. 11) 
 Klaviertrio Nr. 2 (op. 12) 
 Klaviertrio Nr. 3 (op. 23) 
 Klaviertrio Nr. 4 (op. 31) 
 Klaviertrio Nr. 5 (op. 46) 
 Klaviertrio Nr. 6 (op. 54)

Piano Quartets
 Klavierquartett Nr. 1 (op. 26)
 Klavierquartett Nr. 2 (op. 28)

Operas
 „Die Franzosen in Spanien“ (UA Karlsruhe 1841)
 „Der Troubadour“ (UA Braunschweig 1847)
 „Ulrich von Hutten“ (unvollendet)

Operettas
 „Mariette“ (UA Karlsruhe 1838)

Rondos
 Introduction et grand rondeau (op. 3)

Septets
 Großes Septett Nr. 1 (op. 26)
 Großes Septett Nr. 2 (op. 28)

String Quartets
 Streichquartett c-moll

Lieder
 Fünf Lieder von Heinrich Schütz für eine Tenor-Stimme mit Begleitung des Pianoforte (op. 13), Braunschweig, G.M. Meyer jr. 1842

External links 
 
 
 Article on klassica.com: http://www.klassika.info/Komponisten/Fesca/

Notes 
 This article is based on the German Wikipedia page 
  
 

1820 births
1849 deaths
Musicians from Karlsruhe
Deaths from lung disease
German classical pianists
Male classical pianists
19th-century German composers
19th-century classical pianists
19th-century male musicians